Melanophryniscus simplex is a species of toads in the family Bufonidae.

It is endemic to Brazil.
Its natural habitats are subtropical or tropical high-altitude grassland, rivers, intermittent freshwater lakes, and freshwater marshes.
It is threatened by habitat loss.

References

simplex
Endemic fauna of Brazil
Amphibians described in 2002
Taxa named by Ulisses Caramaschi
Taxonomy articles created by Polbot